Ken Horstmann (born April 10, 1971) is an American film and television director. He was born in Norfolk, Virginia.

Early career
Ken graduated from Mount Paran Christian School in (1990). He began his career at Turner Broadcasting in Atlanta, Georgia as a tape operator. Eventually, this led him to directing commercials and television series. He has directed numerous music videos, namely for Family Force 5. The video for "Never Let Me Go" was nominated for a 2008 GMA Dove Award.

Television and film
His television series credits for Cartoon Network include Fridays, Fried Dynamite, and "The Break" (premiering in 2009). He also directs "Vital Signs" for CNN International, hosted by Dr. Sanjay Gupta.

His first feature entitled Upside  starring Randall Bentley of NBC's "Heroes" and based on his script, released October 5, 2010.

Filmography
Feature Films

Documentary Films

Television Series

References

External links

1971 births
Living people
American music video directors
Artists from Norfolk, Virginia
English-language film directors
Film directors from Virginia